Kathryn Mitchell (born 10 July 1982) is an Australian track and field athlete who competes in the javelin throw. She has represented her country at three Olympic Games, finishing ninth in 2012 and sixth in 2016. She won gold at the 2018 Commonwealth Games with a throw of 68.92 m, a Commonwealth Games, Australian and Oceanian record. It also ranks her ninth on the world all-time list.

Personal
Nicknamed Mitch, Mitchell was born on 10 July 1982 in Hamilton, Victoria. She calls Casterton her hometown but lives in Monte Carlo. She went to Casterton Primary School before going to high school at Casterton Secondary College and Ballarat High School. She has a Bachelor of Applied Science in Human Movement  and is working on an advance degree in Nutritional Medicine. She is a fitness services instructor  and health consultant.

Athletics
Mitchell competes in javelin.  As a fourteen-year-old, she started in the sport but did not begin to take the sport seriously until she was seventeen years old.  She took up the sport after her sister borrowed a javelin from school to practice with it for a school event.

Mitchell was coached by Lindsay Burgoyne in high school. She was coached by Eric Hollingsworth from  2003 to 2009. Uwe Hohn has been her coach since 2010. She trains at Olympic Park in Melbourne and has a scholarship with the Victorian Institute of Sport. She is a member of the Eureka Athletics Club.

In 2006, Mitchell represented Australia at the Commonwealth Games, where she made the finals in the javelin, finishing sixth overall. She finished first at the 2008 National Championships in Melbourne, Australia. In 2010, she set a Victorian state record in the javelin. At the 2010 Commonwealth Games, she finished fifth. Prior to competing in India, she spent four weeks training in Germany. She finished second at the 2011 National Championships in Melbourne, Australia. While this distance would have qualified her for Olympics, the nature of the meet precluded it from counting. She finished third at the 2012 Ostrava Golden Spike in Ostrava, Czech Republic. In April, she finished second at the 2012 St. Wendel World Class Meeting in Germany. She was selected to represent Australia in the javelin event at the 2012 Summer Olympics, where she qualified for the final in the women's javelin. Before departing for London, she participated in a Germany-based training camp. At the Rio Summer Olympics in 2016, she placed 6th in the javelin throw final, with an effort of 64.36m.

Mitchell competed at the 2014 Commonwealth Games, finishing fourth, with a best throw 36 cm less than that of bronze medal winning compatriot Kelsey-Lee Roberts. She improved on this performance at the 2018 Games, winning gold with a throw of 68.92m and setting a new Commonwealth Games record.

At the 2020 Tokyo Olympics Mitchell  finished sixth with a throw of 61.82m.

International competitions

References

1982 births
Australian female javelin throwers
Athletes (track and field) at the 2012 Summer Olympics
Athletes (track and field) at the 2016 Summer Olympics
Athletes (track and field) at the 2020 Summer Olympics
Athletes (track and field) at the 2006 Commonwealth Games
Athletes (track and field) at the 2010 Commonwealth Games
Athletes (track and field) at the 2014 Commonwealth Games
Athletes (track and field) at the 2018 Commonwealth Games
Commonwealth Games gold medallists for Australia
Commonwealth Games medallists in athletics
Living people
Olympic athletes of Australia
Olympic female javelin throwers
People educated at Ballarat High School
People from Hamilton, Victoria
Sportswomen from Victoria (Australia)
Victorian Institute of Sport alumni
World Athletics Championships athletes for Australia
20th-century Australian women
21st-century Australian women
Medallists at the 2018 Commonwealth Games